Joe Hill is a 1971 biopic about the Swedish-American labor activist and songwriter Joe Hill, born Joel Emanuel Hägglund in Gävle, Sweden. It was directed by Swedish director Bo Widerberg and is a dramatization of Hill's life, depicting Hill's arrival as a poor immigrant in New York in 1902, his involvement with the Industrial Workers of the World (IWW), and his trial for murder, during which he defended himself.

The film stars Thommy Berggren as Joe Hill, while the rest of the cast were mostly unknowns in their first film roles. It is the only film that Widerberg made in the US.

The film won the Jury Prize at the 1971 Cannes Film Festival.

Joe Hill was mostly unavailable commercially for nearly four decades (though occasionally shown at special film club screenings in Sweden) until a restored and digitally remastered version was produced in 2015 by the National Library of Sweden. It is now available on DVD. The distributor is Studio S Entertainment, Stockholm.

Cast
 Thommy Berggren as Joe Hill
 Anja Schmidt as Lucia
 Kelvin Malave as Fox
 Evert Anderson as Blackie
 Cathy Smith as Cathy
 Hasse Persson as Paul
 David Moritz as David
 Richard Weber as Richard
 Joel Miller as Ed Rowan
 Franco Molinari as Tenor
 Robert Faeder as George
 Wendy Geier as Elizabeth
 Liska March as Sister of Mercy
 Michael Logan

References

External links
 
 

1971 films
Films about activists
1970s biographical drama films
Swedish biographical drama films
Films directed by Bo Widerberg
Industrial Workers of the World in fiction
1971 multilingual films
Swedish multilingual films
American multilingual films
1970s English-language films
English-language Swedish films
1970s Swedish-language films
1971 drama films
1970s Swedish films